(born May 7, 1993) formerly known by her stage name , is a Japanese actress and model.

Early life
Abe was born on May 7, 1993 in Osaka. She attended at the Osaka Prefectural Kitano High School, where she was part of the Aikido team. While in high school, she was involved in Japanese dance, scuba diving and playing piano. She was also part of the high school brass band, where she played flute. In March 2017, she graduated from the Faculty of Environment and Information Studies at Keio University in Tokyo.

Career
While at elementary school, she was discovered and signed on by an agent. She made her debut as an advertising model for Hankyu Department Store. In middle school, she worked as a model for a fashion magazine and later worked as an image character for the Fuji TV anime series Shion no Ō.

On 2010, she made her acting debut in the movie The Chasing World 2 (リアル鬼ごっこ２), as the heroine. She started using her stage name Jun Yoshinaga. In 2012, she played as one of the main casts in the Japanese comedy-drama television series Perfect Son. As a result of her role in the series, she garnered attention and the number of access to her official blog grew.

In 2014, she starred in the movie Still the Water directed by Naomi Kawase. She was selected as the cast for the movie, due to her experience in scuba diving during her time in high school, at "the beauty of swimming" audition in Amami Ōshima. For her performance in the movie, she received the Best Actress Award at the Sakhalin International Film Festival and Best New Actress Award at the Takasaki Film Festival.

In August 2014, Abe took a career break and quit her acting agency to head to the United States for a year to study English and Drama at New York University. While studying at the NYU Tisch School of the Arts, she met her acting agency staff and returned to Japan in 2015.
Following her return to Japan, she started to use her birth name as stage name. Abe auditioned for NHK TV serial Toto Neechan and was cast for the role of heroine's friend, Aya Nakada.

On 2019, she starred in movie The Prisoner of Sakura, a Japan-Russia co-production, which was based on the true story of a war prison in Matsuyama, Ehime Prefecture, during the Russo-Japanese War. In the movie, she has a dual role.

Filmography

Films
The Chasing World 2  (2010) – Sato Ai
Wasao (2011) - Tagawa Maki
A Man With Style (2011) - Miyata Momoko
Tonnerura de Boo (2011) - Sakiko Toyama
In the City of Dawn (2011) - young Nakanishi Akiba 
Lifeline (2014) - main role
My Hawaiian Discovery (2014) - Mako
Still the Water (2014) - Kyoko
Home Away From Home (2014) - Akiko
The Limit of Sleeping Beauty (2017) - Maria
Dawn Wind in My Poncho (2017) - Maria
The Blood of Wolves (2018) - Momoko Okada
The Man From the Sea (2018) - Sachiko
Samurai Marathon (2018) - Shiori Uesugi
The Prisoner of Sakura (2019) - Yui Takeda / Sakurako Takamiya
I Don't Want to Be Like You (2019)
Daughters (2020) - Kiyokawa Ayano
The Voice of Sin (2020) - young Sone Mayumi
461 Days of Bento: A Promise Between Father and Son (2020) - Yajima Maka
Baragaki: Unbroken Samurai (2021) - Itosato
A Dog Named Palma (2021) - Akita Dog Museum staff
Ring Wandering (2022) - Midori / Kozue
Yes, I Can't Swim (2022) - Namie
Miss Osaka (2022)
Remember to Breathe (2022)

Television
Drama W Beat (2011) – Terumi Higuchi
Perfect Son (2012) - Hyouzuka Masako
Rumic Theater (2012) - Hazuki Fuwa
Special Spy Zone (2012) - Kitagawa Natsumi
Gozen 3-ji no Muhōchitai (2013) - Haruka
In the Room (2013) - Narukawa Rui
Toto Neechan (2016) - Aya Nakada
A Girl & Three Sweethearts (2016) - Ishikawa Wakaba
Tales of the Unusual Story Autumn Special Edition (2016) - Natsuki Tokita
Osaka Kanjousen Part 2  (2017) - Fujimoto Asahi
4-go Keibi (2017) - Ueno Yu
I Will Threaten You From Now On (2017) - Momoka Kobashi
Tokyo Vampire Hotel (2017) - Yui
Swab (2018) - Faculty role
Caseworker's Diary (2018) - Kataoka Mari 
Heisei Bashiru (2018) - Ayaka Ekuni
BRIDGE Begins on 1995.1.17 Kobe (2019) - Ritsu Takeda
Fruits Takuhaibin (2019) - Sumomo
Sasurai Onsen (2019) - Yabe Junko 
No Side Game (2019) - Fujishima Rena
Really Scary Story (2019) - Asuka Miyazaki 
Shiyakusho (2019) - Imoto Midori
Keiji to Kenji - Shokatsu to Chiken no 24ji (2019) - Ishida Kiriko 
Papa ga Mo Ichido Koi wo Shita (2020) - Kawakami Yukari
Sunday Prime Funny Detective  (2020) - Rena Gazuma
Toshishita Kareshi  (2020) - Yoko
Tantei Yuri Rintaro (2020) - Kawase Fumino
Dakara Watashi wa Make Suru (2020) - Kawamatsu Yasuko
Ochoyan (2020-21) - Wakasaki Yoko

Online
Nestlé Theater on YouTube "Day and Night" (2014) -  Shiori Haneda

Commercials
Suntory - C.C. Lemon  (April 2011)
Haruyama Trading Co., Ltd. (February 2013)
Starbucks 
Odakyu Electric Railway  (August 11, 2017)
ABC-Mart - Asics/Asics GEL-PROMESA (January 25, 2018)
Daily Yamazaki (February 2018)

Radio drama
FM Radio Drama Retake Sixteen - Starring Saori Komine (NHK FM, 26 August 2013 - 13 September 2013)

Music videos
Tatsuro Yamashita - Cheer Up! The Summer (2016)
MOROHA - Revolution (2018)
Mr. Children - Gravity and Breath (2018)

References

External links
  
 
  
  

1993 births
Japanese film actresses
Japanese television actresses
Japanese female models
Living people
21st-century Japanese actresses
Keio University alumni
Amuse Inc. talents
Actresses from Osaka